Norbert Verweyen (born 8 October 1950) is a German former swimmer. He competed in the men's 200 metre backstroke at the 1972 Summer Olympics.

References

1950 births
Living people
German male swimmers
Olympic swimmers of West Germany
Swimmers at the 1972 Summer Olympics
Sportspeople from Bonn